César Hernán Valenzuela Martínez (born 4 September 1992), known as César Valenzuela, is a Chilean footballer that currently plays for Huachipato.

International career

Valenzuela got his first call up to the senior Chile squad for a friendly against the United States in January 2015.

References

External links
 
 

1992 births
Living people
Footballers from Santiago
Chilean footballers
Chile youth international footballers
Chilean expatriate footballers
Club Deportivo Palestino footballers
Udinese Calcio players
Club Recreativo Granada players
Cádiz CF B players
C.D. Huachipato footballers
Everton de Viña del Mar footballers
Chilean Primera División players
Tercera División players
Chilean expatriate sportspeople in Italy
Chilean expatriate sportspeople in Spain
Expatriate footballers in Italy
Expatriate footballers in Spain
Association football midfielders